The 15th General Assembly of Prince Edward Island represented the colony of Prince Edward Island between January 22, 1839, and 1843.

The Assembly sat at the pleasure of the Governor of Prince Edward Island, Charles Augustus FitzRoy.  William Cooper was elected speaker.

Members

The members of the Prince Edward Island Legislature after the general election of 1839 were:

External links 
 Journal of the House of Assembly of Prince Edward Island (1839)

Terms of the General Assembly of Prince Edward Island
1839 establishments in Prince Edward Island
1843 disestablishments in Prince Edward Island